Faedo is one of nine parishes in the Cudillero municipality, within the province and autonomous community of Asturias, in northern Spain. 

The population is 147 (INE 2007).

Villages
Corollos
La Fenosa
Orderias
La Tabla
Villeirín

References

Parishes in Cudillero